Ronald Crabtree (30 April 1930 – 2 February 1976) known by his stage name Danny Ross, was a British comedian best remembered for his role alongside Jimmy Clitheroe in the long running BBC Radio comedy show The Clitheroe Kid (1957–1973).

Ross played the part of "Alfie Hall", the dim witted, mismatched boyfriend of Jimmy's posh sister "Susan" (Diana Day). Alfie Hall was a name Danny Ross had used prior to The Clitheroe Kid, including during a television series in 1956 entitled I'm Not Bothered... which followed the exploits of milkman "Alf Hall" and his stuttering mate, "Wally Binns" (Glenn Melvyn). The phrase "I'm not bothered..." was occasionally used by Danny Ross in The Clitheroe Kid as a catchphrase, in indecisive (but not unfriendly) responses when given a decision by girlfriend "Susan".

Danny had made his reputation in comedy by starring alongside Arthur Askey and Glenn Melvyn in The Love Match – a hit stage comedy presented for a summer season at the Grand Theatre, Blackpool, in 1953, that led to the spin-off TV series Love and Kisses. He had also starred in the George Formby role in the revival of the stage musical Zip Goes a Million, and later made a pop record of Formby's hit song "The Old Bazaar in Cairo".

Personal life
Danny Ross was born in Oldham, Lancashire, England on 30 April 1930, the only son of John William Crabtree (1895–1964), a cotton spinner, and his wife, Martha Jane (née Grady, 23 August 1895 – 1979). He was taken ill on New Year's Day 1976, en route to London with his manager to arrange a new show. He died of a heart attack at Blackpool's Victoria Hospital, on 2 February 1976 at the age of 45.

Filmography 
1.	"Just Jimmy (TV Series) (ABC-tv)" .... Cousin Danny (51 episodes, 1964–1968)

2.	"Friends and Neighbours" (1959) .... Sebastian Green

3.	"The Anne Shelton Show" (1 episode, 1959)
 Episode dated 19 January 1959 (1959) TV episode

4.	"Living It Up" .... Danny, props boy (2 episodes, 1957–1958)
 Episode No.2.1 (1958) TV episode .... Danny, props boy
 Episode No.1.3 (1957) TV episode .... Danny, props boy

5.	"I'm Not Bothered (TV series)" .... Alf Hall (7 episodes, 1956)
 Episode No.1.26 (1956) TV episode .... Alf Hall
 Episode No.1.10 (1956) TV episode .... Alf Hall
 Episode No.1.9 (1956) TV episode .... Alf Hall
 Episode No.1.8 (1956) TV episode .... Alf Hall
 Episode No.1.7 (1956) TV episode .... Alf Hall
     
6.	"Ramsbottom Rides Again" (1956) .... Danny

7.	"Love and Kisses" .... Alf Hall (5 episodes, 1955)
 Episode No.1.1 (1955) TV episode .... Alf Hall
 Episode No.1.2 (1955) TV episode .... Alf Hall
 Bill Goes on the Stage (1955) TV episode .... Alf Hall
 Bill Mixes More Trouble (1955) TV episode .... Alf Hall
 Bill's Bright Ideas (1955) TV episode .... Alf Hall

8.	"The Love Match" (1955) .... Alf Hall

References 

Information courtesy of the official Jimmy Clitheroe website and the IMDb.

External links 
Jimmy Clitheroe memorial website

People from Oldham
1976 deaths
British male comedians
20th-century British comedians
1930 births